The 1887 New South Wales colonial election was for 124 members representing 74 electoral districts. The election was conducted on the basis of a simple majority or first-past-the-post voting system. In this election there were 35 multi-member districts returning 87 members and 37 single member districts giving a total of 124 members. In the multi-member districts each elector could vote for as many candidates as there were vacancies. 13 districts were uncontested. This was the first election at which there were recognisable political parties. The average number of enrolled voters per seat was 1,984, ranging from Boorowa (1,103) to Canterbury (3,161).

Election results

Albury

Argyle

Balmain

Balranald

The other sitting member John Cramsie did not contest the election.

Bathurst

The Bogan

The other sitting member Patrick Jennings did not contest the election.

Boorowa

Bourke

The sitting members were Russell Barton and William Sawers, both of whom resigned on 2 December 1886. A writ was issued for a by-election, which was held on 21 January 1887, with the result Thomas Waddell 1019, William Willis 833 and Alexander Wilson 682. The writ was not returned however as the parliament was dissolved on 26 January.

Braidwood

Camden

Canterbury

Three of the sitting members, Mark Hammond, William Judd and Septimus Stephen, did not contest the election.

Carcoar

The other sitting member Ezekiel Baker did not contest the election.

The Clarence

Central Cumberland

Durham

East Macquarie

The other sitting member John Shepherd unsuccessfully contested Paddington.

East Maitland

East Sydney

The two other sitting members Edmund Barton was appointed to the Legislative Council and Henry Copeland successfully contested New England.

Eden

Forbes

The other sitting member Walter Coonan did not contest the election.

The Glebe

Glen Innes

The sitting member William Fergusson unsuccessfully contested Wentworth.

Gloucester

The sitting member Robert White did not contest the election. John McLaughlin had been unsuccessful in contesting Paddington on 9 February.

Goulburn

Grafton

Grenfell

Gundagai

Gunnedah

The sitting member Joseph Abbott successfully contested Wentworth.

The Gwydir

Hartley

The sitting member Walter Targett unsuccessfully contested The Hastings and Manning.

The Hastings and Manning

Walter Targett was the member for Hartley

The Hawkesbury

The Hume

The Hunter

Illawarra

Inverell

Kiama

The Macleay

Molong

Monaro

Morpeth

The sitting member Robert Wisdom did not contest the election.

Mudgee

The other sitting member Thomas Browne unsuccessfully contested Wentworth.

The Murray

The Murrumbidgee

The other sitting member Alexander Bolton did not contest the election.

The Namoi

The sitting member Charles Collins did not contest the election.

The Nepean

New England

Newcastle

Newtown

Northumberland

| colspan="3"   |  
	| colspan="3" style="text-align:center;" | (1 new seat)

Orange

Paddington

The other sitting member Robert Butcher did not contest the election. John Shepherd was the member for East Macquarie. John McLaughlin also unsuccessfully contested Gloucester.

Parramatta

Patrick's Plains

Queanbeyan

Redfern

| colspan="3"   |  
	| colspan="3" style="text-align:center;" | (1 new seat)

The other sitting member Thomas Williamson did not contest the election.

The Richmond

The other sitting member Patrick Hogan did not contest the election.

Shoalhaven

The sitting member Frederick Humphery did not contest the election.

South Sydney

The other sitting member Joseph Olliffe did not contest the election.

St Leonards

Tamworth

The other sitting member Michael Burke did not contest the election.

Tenterfield

Tumut

The Upper Hunter

Wellington

Wentworth

William MacGregor one of two sitting members for Wentworth. The other sitting member Edward Quin did not contest the election. Joseph Abbott was the member for [[Results of the 1887 New South Wales colonial election#Gunnedah|Gunnedah]], Thomas Browne was the member for [[Results of the 1887 New South Wales colonial election#Mudgee|Mudgee]] and William Fergusson was the member for [[Results of the 1887 New South Wales colonial election#Glen Innes|Glen Innes]].

West Macquarie

The sitting member Lewis Lloyd did not contest the election.

West Maitland

West Sydney

Wollombi

Yass Plains

Young

See also 

 Candidates of the 1887 New South Wales colonial election
 Members of the New South Wales Legislative Assembly, 1887–1889

References 

1887